The 1995 European Fencing Championships were held in Keszthely, Hungary. The competition consisted of individual events only.

Medal summary

Men's events

Women's events

Medal table

References 
 Results at the European Fencing Confederation

1995
European Fencing Championships
European Fencing Championships
International fencing competitions hosted by Hungary